Clear Lake is a populated place located in Collin County, Texas on the south end of the Lavon Lake Peninsula. By land it is south of Princeton and over water northwest of Lavon, southwest of Copeville, and north of Wylie.

Population
In 1910 the population of Clear Lake was estimated at seventy-five and by 1914 had grown to 100. Despite the construction of the Lavon Reservoir in 1954, the estimated number of residents at the community remained at fifty for the period from the 1930s to 1990.

History
The United States government in 1884 built and operated a distillery on the banks of nearby Clear Lake. A small number of settlers were attracted to the area by the federal project, after which the town of Clear Lake was established in 1890. In 1898 a post office was established but it was discontinued sometime after 1930. The postmaster was Robert L. Palmer. The community was a principal provider of bois d'arc timber for Dallas for several years at the beginning of its existence. Dallas was experimenting with the use of wood to pave its streets but after the project was abandoned many residents left Clear Lake. The community was also on the Gulf, Colorado and Santa Fe Railway. The land surrounding Clear Lake was subject to seasonal flooding, which destroyed crops even though it was located in the heart of the Blackland Prairie

Geography
The census enumeration district map of 1940, Collin County E.D. 43-39, shows Clear Lake west of the confluence of Ticky Creek and Pilot Grove Creek which today is submerged in Lavon Lake.

Further reading
 Courier - Gazette, early 1940 Clear Lake

References

External links 
 TopoQuest
 TX HomeTownLocator
 Roadside Thoughts

Unincorporated communities in Collin County, Texas
Unincorporated communities in Texas